Gustave Léon Niox ( - ) was a French général, Governor of Les Invalides, director of the Musée de l'Armée, and a military historian.

Career
Born in 1840 to Eutrope Léon Niox and Elisabeth Caroline Desrayaud, he entered the Ecole Spéciale Militaire de Saint-Cyr in 1856 to join the 10th Infantry Regiment, then l'École d'État-Major in 1859, training to command the 66th Regiment in January 1861. He served with the Zouaves of the Imperial Guard and the second regiment of the Chasseurs d'Afrique, and was part of the French intervention in Mexico in the general staff, first in the topographical service, then later in the historical services.

He returned to France to serve in the Ministry of Defense. He served in the Franco-Prussian War as a member of the general staff for the 6th Army of the Rhine, and was taken prisoner during the siege of Metz. On his return in 1871 he was transferred to join the staff of l'Ecole d'État-Major, teaching cosmography, physical geography, and statistics. He was made inspector of telegraph services in 1898.

Historian
He became professor at l'École Supérieure de Guerre in 1882.

Put on reserve in 1910, he began in earnest on his history. A number of his writings were published, and had a wide influence on the public and on the military on matters of military geography.

Publications 
 De l'emploi des chemins de fer pour les mouvements stratégiques, Paris, Dumaine, 1873.
 Expédition du Mexique : 1861-1867, Librairie militaire de J. Dumaine, 1874
 Notions de géologie [Texte imprimé] : géographie militaire, Paris, J. Dumaine, 1876.
 L'Empire russe, Corbeil, impr. de Crété, 1886.
 L'Indo-Chine, Corbeil, impr. de Crété, 1886.
 Péninsule des Balkans, Corbeil, impr. de Crété, 1886.
 Sénégal et NIger, Corbeil, impr. de Crété, 1886.
 Ct Niox, Eugène Darsy, Atlas de géographie physique, politique et historique à l'usage des classes, Paris, G. Delagrave.
 La Guerre de 1870. Simple récit, Paris, C. Delagrave, 1896.
 La Guerre Russo-Japonaise. Chroniques, Ch. Delgrave, 1906.
 L'Hôtel des Invalides, Paris, Ch. Delagrave, 1909.
 Drapeaux et trophées, résumé de l'histoire militaire contemporaine de la France, catalogue du Musée de l'armée, Paris, Ch. Delagrave, 1910.
 La Grande guerre, 1914-1918, simple récit, Paris, J. de Gigord, 1921.
 Sept volumes de la Géographie militaire publiés entre 1876 et 1895.

Notes and references

http://www.ecole-superieure-de-guerre.fr/prof-niox.html

External links
 

1840 births
1921 deaths
French generals
French military personnel of the Franco-Prussian War
French military personnel of the Second French intervention in Mexico
École Spéciale Militaire de Saint-Cyr alumni
Recipients of the Legion of Honour
Recipients of the Ordre des Palmes Académiques
People from Provins